The European Route of Industrial Heritage (ERIH) is a tourist route of the most important industrial heritage sites in Europe. This is a tourism industry information initiative to present a network of industrial heritage sites across Europe. The aim of the project is to create interest for the common European heritage of the Industrialisation and its legacy. ERIH also wants to promote regions, towns and sites showing the industrial history and market them as visitor attractions in the leisure and tourism industry.

History
The concept of using a European Route of Industrial Heritage was born in 1999; it was recognised there had been no single event to shape the European landscape greater than the industrial revolution. That changed the working culture of all Europeans, and gave common experiences to communities across Europe whether it be deep mine coal working in the Rühr or South Wales. Four countries, Great Britain, Belgium, Germany and the Netherlands successfully applied for EU Interreg IIC (North-Western Europe) funding to draw up a master plan. The plan demonstrates the economic potential as a primarily marketing brand. It also shows a possible structure. Its reasoning was that many individual sites had great footfall others had a very low profile. They used the analogy of small shops gathering together in large shopping centres for joint promotion. In the language of EU proposals the hubs are called anchor points; these could be cities or existing industrial sites with a developed tourism infrastructure.

The plan culminated in the Duisburg Declaration 

With the plan adopted its implementation was funded by Interreg IIIB-north-western Europe, and the scheme rolled out; starting in the northwest and progressing south and east. ERIH is a registered association under German law. When funding ran out there were 850 member attractions which has risen to 1,850 sites across the EU28 countries. In October 2014 further funding was obtained from the EU Creative Europe programme . The European Route of Industrial Heritage has been a Cultural Route of the Council of Europe since 2019.

Anchor points
The – virtual – main route is built by the so-called Anchor Points. These are Industrial Heritage sites which are the historically most important and most attractive for visitors. The route leads through 13 countries thus far (in 2014): United Kingdom, the Netherlands, Belgium, Luxembourg, Germany, France, Spain, Italy, Czech Republic, Poland, Sweden, Norway, Denmark, and Portugal (in 2017).

The anchor sites in are:

Regional Routes
Regional Routes (like the Route der Industriekultur in the Ruhr) cover regions as where industrial history has left its mark. Currently (2017) there are seventeen:
Austria
Styrian Iron Trail 
Germany
Northwest
Ruhrgebiet
Industrial Valleys
Euregio Maas-Rhine
Saxony-Anhalt
Lusatia
Rhine-Main
Saar Lor Lux
Netherlands
HollandRoute
Euregio Maas-Rhine
Poland
Silesia
Spain
Catalonia

United Kingdom
Southwest Yorkshire
South Wales
Cornwall

European Theme Routes
Thirteen European Theme Routes show the diversity of industrial landscapes all over Europe and the common roots of industrial history:
 Application of Power
 Housing and Architecture
 Industry and War
 Iron and Steel
 Industrial Landscapes
 Mining
 Paper
 Production & Manufacturing
 Salt
 Service and Leisure Industry 
 Textiles
 Transport & Communication
 Water

Footnotes

References

External links

 Official website

Industrial archaeology
 
German tourist routes
Industrial tourism